Keels is a small town in the Canadian province of Newfoundland and Labrador, located about 3 kilometres from Duntara.  The population of this municipality in the 2016 Canadian National Census was 51. This is down from 61 in 2011 and 73 in 2006. The earlier population figures show it had 85 in 2001, 101 in 1996, 128 in 1991, 115 in 1986, 206 in 1956 and 372 in 1940.

Like many outport villages in Newfoundland, population has been shrinking with the collapse of the cod fishing industry. Some of the highlights in Keels are the geological features known as "the Devil's Footprints" that are found on the rocks surrounding the town, the Anglican Cemetery that dates to the beginnings of the community, and a natural sea-spray phenomenon known as "Clark's Chimney Hole" on the coast.  The one and only store located in the middle of the community has been owned by the Mesh family for generations.  The Way Office was established in 1885 and the first Waymaster was Edward Penny.

There is also an Anglican church and a small wharf which was used for commercial fishing until the cod fishery moratorium in 1992. The community is somewhat of a tourist attraction because it is one of the smallest and oldest communities in Newfoundland. In addition, there are several restored homes that are excellent examples of outport architecture, including the restored "Orange Hall" which was once a meeting hall for the Orange Order.

Demographics 

See also 
List of communities in Newfoundland and Labrador

References 

Towns in Newfoundland and Labrador